Roderick Victor Gaskin (November 23, 1934 – July 14, 2012) was an American jazz bassist.

Gaskin was born in The Bronx, New York and moved to Los Angeles in 1962. He started playing with Paul Horn and Red Mitchell and went on to become one of many bass players for the Jazz Crusaders. He also recorded with Curtis Amy and Dupree Bolton,  before becoming a part of the West Coast jazz scene, accompanying Buddy Collette, Shelly Manne, and Bud Shank.

Between 1966 and 1970, he was a member of Cannonball Adderley's groups, and in 1970 recorded with Duke Ellington's octet, quintet, quartet and trio.

He started playing with the Billy Taylor Trio in the late 1970s, continuing until 1993, as well as with Johnny Hartman and Hank Jones.

Between 1994 and 2001 Victor Gaskin was in Singapore and performed regularly at The Four Seasons Hotel with Boni de Souza & Friends for the iconic Sunday Jazz Brunch. They were pioneers of the Sunday Jazz Brunch scene in Singapore, setting the trend for other similar hotel offerings for years to come. During Victor's stay in Singapore, he was also featured on two jazz albums produced by Boni de Souza. The first was a Latin jazz-infused CD featuring Wendy Low (flute), Boni de Souza (piano), Gaskin (bass) and Sanip Ismail (drums). The second and more definitive offering was Eau de Vie featuring some original compositions by Boni de Souza as well as alternative arrangements of jazz standards which featured Gaskin, Farid Ali (guitar), de Souza, Low and Ismail, with various guest musicians.

Gaskin died in Frederiksted, U.S. Virgin Islands.

Discography 
With Cannonball Adderley
Mercy, Mercy, Mercy! Live at 'The Club' (Capitol, 1966)
Cannonball in Japan (Capitol, 1966 [1990])
74 Miles Away (Capitol, 1967)
With  Monty Alexander
Alexander the Great (Pacific Jazz, 1964) 
With Curtis Amy and Dupree Bolton
Katanga! (Pacific Jazz, 1963)
With Hal Galper
The Guerilla Band (Mainstream, 1971)
Wild Bird (Mainstream, 1972)
With Johnny Hartman
Once in Every Life (Bee Hive, 1980)
With Paul Horn
Profile of a Jazz Musician (Columbia, 1962)
With The Jazz Crusaders
The Jazz Crusaders at the Lighthouse (Pacific Jazz, 1962)
The Thing (Pacific Jazz, 1965) 
With Herbie Mann and Tamiko Jones
A Mann & A Woman (Atlantic, 1967)
With John Mayall
Moving On (Polydor, 1972)
Ten Years Are Gone (Polydor, 1973)
With Les McCann
Spanish Onions  (Pacific Jazz, 1964)
A Bag of Gold (Pacific Jazz, 1964) 
McCann/Wilson (Pacific Jazz, 1964) with the Gerald Wilson Orchestra
McCanna (Pacific Jazz, 1964)
But Not Really (Limelight, 1964)
Beaux J. Pooboo (Limelight, 1965)
Live at Shelly's Manne-Hole (Limelight, 1966)
Live at Bohemian Caverns - Washington, DC (Limelight, 1967)
With Susannah McCorkle
As Time Goes By (CBS/Sony, 1986)
With  Oliver Nelson
Swiss Suite (Flying Dutchman, 1971)
With Billy Taylor
Live at Storyville (West 54, 1977)
The Jazzmobile Allstars (Taylor Made, 1989) with Frank Wess, Jimmy Owens, Ted Dunbar and Bobby Thomas
With Buddy Terry
Awareness (Mainstream, 1971)
With Clark Terry
Portraits (Chesky, 1989)
With Leon Thomas
Gold Sunrise on Magic Mountain (Mega/Flying Dutchman, 1971)
With Larry Willis
Inner Crisis (Groove Merchant, 1973)
With Gerald Wilson
On Stage (Pacific Jazz, 1965) 
With Attila Zoller

Gypsy Cry (Embryo, 1969)

With Boni de Souza 
Eau de Vie (BDSMUSIC 2000)

Busy doing Something (BDSMUSIC 1998)

References 

1934 births
People from the Bronx
American jazz double-bassists
Male double-bassists
2012 deaths
Duke Ellington Orchestra members
Jazz musicians from New York (state)
American male jazz musicians
Cannonball Adderley Quintet members